Liftaya (also spelled Laftaya) is a village in central Syria, administratively part of the Homs Governorate, located southwest of Homs near Lake Homs. Nearby localities include Wujuh al-Hajar to the southeast, Khirbet Ghazi, Khirbet al-Sawda and Khirbet Tin Nur to the northeast. According to the Central Bureau of Statistics (CBS), Liftaya had a population of 2,047 in the 2004 census.

Inscribed stone lintels discovered at the town helped in studying and dating the Christianization process of Emesa and its surrounding countryside. Lintels from the Palladis household, dated to 449/450 attest to clear pagan traditions. The first waves of Christianization came in the 460s, when lintels bearing crosses were discovered with increasing numbers alongside pagan ones. The full Christinization of the village is dated to 508/510 at the time when the village's first church was built.

References

Populated places in Homs District